Phyu Thi (born 1938) is a Burmese pop singer. Despite her prolific decades-long career, she performed in front of a live audience for the first time in 33 years, during her first concert in March 2013, at the National Theatre of Yangon. She has released 14 albums.

Discography 

 Mile Paung Kaday (မိုင်ပေါင်းကုဋေ) (1981)
 Annawar Chit Kha Yee (အဏ္ဏဝါချစ်ခရီး) (1981)
 A Chit Empire (အချစ်အင်ပါယာ) (1982)
 Plute Hmar Hnit Yaut Tal (ပလူတိုမှာနှစ်ယောက်တည်း) (1983)
 Moe Nya Wingabar (မိုးညဝင်္ကပါ) (1983)
 Parami Phyae Phet (ပါရမီဖြည့်ဖက်) (1984)
 Hey (ဟေ့) (1984)
 Moe Nat Maung Shin (မိုးနတ်မောင်ရှင်) (1987)

References 

1938 births
Living people
20th-century Burmese women singers